Sue Rezin is a Republican member of the Illinois Senate, representing the 38th district since her appointment in December 2010. The 38th district includes Bureau, Putnam, LaSalle, Grundy, and Kendall counties in north central Illinois.

Illinois Senate
Rezin was elected to the Illinois House of Representatives in November 2010, and subsequently appointed to the Illinois State Senate. She was selected by the Illinois Republican Party county chairman to fill the seat of Gary G. Dahl, who resigned on December 2, 2010. She was sworn in as state senator on December 14, 2010, and elected to serve a four-year term in November 2012. She represents the 38th Legislative District. In 2015, she was appointed assistant leader in the Senate GOP Caucus. In 2021, Rezin was appointed Deputy Leader of the Senate GOP caucus. She currently serves on the following committees: Education (Minority Spokesperson); Energy and Public Utilities (Minority Spokesperson); Human Rights (Minority Spokesperson); Executive; Health; Insurance; Subcommittee on Public Health; Subcommittee on Special Issues (H); Executive-Consolidation; Executive- Government Operations; Sub on Next Generation Nuclear.

Other work 
On a national level, Senator Rezin is an active member of the National Conference of State Legislatures (NCSL), which is a bipartisan organization that brings legislators and staff from across the county together to collaborate and share information to help craft the best solutions to problems states face. Senator Rezin currently serves on NCSL’s 63-member Executive Committee and Task Force on Energy Supply. Rezin also serves on the board of directors for the National Foundation for Women Legislators.

2020 Congressional campaign
On July 9, 2019, Rezin announced that she would be a candidate for the United States House of Representatives in the 14th congressional district in 2020 — even though a resident of the 16th — and planned on unseating first-term incumbent Democrat Lauren Underwood.  She was narrowly defeated in the March 2020 Republican primary by fellow state Senator Jim Oberweis.

Personal life
Rezin and her husband, Keith, have four children. They reside in Morris, Illinois.

She has been a board member and former vice president of the Community Foundation of Greater Grundy County. She also serves on the board of directors for We Care of Grundy County.

References

External links
Official site

1963 births
21st-century American politicians
21st-century American women politicians
Augustana College (Illinois) alumni
Republican Party Illinois state senators
Living people
People from Morris, Illinois
Women state legislators in Illinois